Bherya is a village located in Hosa Agrahara Hobli, Krishnarajapete Taluka, Mysuru district of the Indian state of Karnataka. The village is a holy place, hosting 1200 year old Sri Chennakeshava temple. Now it is also famous for Doddamma and Kariyamma Temples.

 

Bherya is located 10 km northeast of the town of Saligrama, 18 km north of town of Krishnarajanagara town, 21 km, southwest of the town of Krishnarajapete and 60 km northwest of the city of Mysuru. It is located on the National Highway 373, north of River Kaveri and west of River Hemavati.

Temples
Bherya has a beautiful temple of Lord Chennakeshava, a form of Lord Vishnu. The temple was built during the Hoysala era. Alternatively, it is built by Cholas; a minister of Chola's destiny named as Dhodda Bhaira built this Village and Temple, hence follows the name of this village Bherya (Bhaira). The main deity, Chennakeshava's idol is made up of soap stone and has a profusely carved Prabhavali. Doorway at the garbhagriha (innermost sanctum of a temple) entrance is also intricately carved. There are Jaya-Vijaya idols in stone at the doorway. The garbagraha has no Shikara. The surrounding of garbhagraha has many fine sculptures; most are broken including Dashavatara images. The ceiling of the  has a well carved, considerably deep Bhuvaneshwari representing dikpalas in addition to geometrical and floral patterns. The Devakoshta has many has many fine relief sculptures. The architecture of a temple is along that of Temples in Beluru and Halebidu, but on a much smaller scale. The whole complex is begging for an urgent restoration and maintain ace.

The place also has temples for Lord Ishwara and Anjaneya, and a mosque.

An inscription in front of Anjaneya temple, dated 1606 AD quotes Devaraja Mahipala, perhaps Chikka Devaraja, son of Mysuru Maharaja Devaraja Wodeyar. It speaks of village Bherya along with its twelve hamlets being converted into a new agrahara, and being renamed as Devarajapura.

Education
 Moraji Desai  School
 Government First Grade College
 Government Junior College
 Government Higher Primary School
 Dayananda Vidya Sansthe Primary & High School

Demographics
There are 4,915  people in Bherya  living in 1092 houses.

PIN code
There is a post office in Bherya and the postal code is 571608.

Image gallery

See also
 Saligrama, Mysore
 Krishnarajanagara
 Kikkeri

References

Villages in Mysore district